Musa Sherif, (born 7 September 1971) is an Indian Motorsports professional and seven-time Indian National champion co-driver competing in the Indian National Rally Championship (INRC). Born in Kumble, a small town in Kasargod district, he made his debut in 1993 and became the first Indian to complete 300 rallies, both in two-wheeler and four-wheelers in all formats of rallying including TSD rallies.

Career
Sherif got hooked on rallying in 1993 when he competed in the Mandovi rally at Mangalore as a rider and shifted to  four-wheelers in 1995. He currently competes in yellow colours with JK Tyre team and navigates for seven-time National champion driver Gaurav Gill. The duo won the popular Karnataka 1000 rally, the second round of the delayed INRC 2021 where he completed 300 rallies including 69 international rallies. He also won 35 rounds of the INRC of which 33 came with Gaurav Gill in front of the steering wheel.

Musa also entered the Limca Book of Records in 2011 for navigating for and winning three championship titles in a year (2009).

National championship winner

References 

Indian rally drivers
Indian racing drivers
MRF Challenge Formula 2000 Championship drivers
JK Tyre National Level Racing Championship drivers
World Rally Championship drivers
Living people
1971 births